Canadarm or Canadarm1 (officially Shuttle Remote Manipulator System or SRMS, also SSRMS) is a series of robotic arms that were used on the Space Shuttle orbiters to deploy, manoeuvre, and capture payloads. After the Space Shuttle Columbia disaster, the Canadarm was always paired with the Orbiter Boom Sensor System (OBSS), which was used to inspect the exterior of the shuttle for damage to the thermal protection system.

Development 

In 1969, Canada was invited by the National Aeronautics and Space Administration (NASA) to participate in the Space Shuttle program. At the time what that participation would entail had not yet been decided but a manipulator system was identified as an important component. Canadian company DSMA ATCON had developed a robot to load fuel into CANDU nuclear reactors; this robot attracted NASA's attention. In 1975, NASA and the Canadian National Research Council (NRC) signed a memorandum of understanding that Canada would develop and construct the Canadarm.

NRC awarded the manipulator contract to Spar Aerospace (now MDA). Three systems were constructed within this design, development, test, and evaluation contract: an engineering model to assist in the design and testing of the Canadarm, a qualification model that was subjected to environmental testing to qualify the design for use in space, and a flight unit.

End effector
Anthony "Tony" Zubrzycki, a design engineer at DSMA ATCON, while seconded to SPAR, originated the concept for the Canadarm End Effector, inspired by an elastic band around his fingers. Zubrzycki formally presented this concept to NASA officials. Frank Mee, head of the SPAR mechanical development laboratory, built the end effector prototype based on Tony's concept and is credited by SPAR as the inventor of the Canadarm End Effector. The three-wire crossover design won over the claw-like mechanisms and others, such as the camera iris model, that were being considered.

Controls and software 
The main control algorithms were developed by SPAR and by subcontractor Dynacon Inc. of Toronto. CAE Electronics Ltd. in Montreal provided the display and control panel and the hand controllers located in the Shuttle aft flight deck. Other electronic interfaces, servo amplifiers, and power conditioners located on the Canadarm were designed and built by SPAR at its Montreal factory. The graphite composite boom that provides the structural connection between the shoulder and the elbow joint and the similar boom that connects the elbow to the wrist were produced by General Dynamics in the United States. Dilworth, Secord, Meagher and Associates, Ltd. in Toronto was contracted to produce the engineering model end effector then SPAR evolved the design and produced the qualification and flight units. The Space Shuttle flight software that monitors and controls the Canadarm was developed in Houston, Texas, by the Federal Systems Division of IBM. Rockwell International's Space Transportation Systems Division designed, developed, tested, and built the systems used to attach the Canadarm to the payload bay of the orbiter.

An acceptance ceremony for NASA was held at Spar's RMS Division in Toronto on 11 February 1981. Here Larkin Kerwin, then the head of the NRC, gave the SRMS the informal name, Canadarm.

The first Canadarm was delivered to NASA in April 1981. Astronaut Judith Resnik developed the NASA software and onboard operating procedures for the system. In all, five arms – Nos. 201, 202, 301, 302, and 303 – were built and delivered to NASA. Arm 302 was lost in the Challenger accident.

Design and capabilities 

While able to maneuver payloads with the mass of a loaded bus in space, the arm motors cannot lift the arm's own weight when on the ground. NASA, therefore, developed a model of the arm for use at its training facility within the Johnson Space Center located in Houston, Texas. The Canadarm can also retrieve, repair and deploy satellites, provide a mobile extension ladder for extravehicular activity crew members for work stations or foot restraints, and be used as an inspection aid to allow the flight crew members to view the orbiter's or payload's surfaces through a television camera on the Canadarm.

The basic Canadarm configuration consists of a manipulator arm, a Canadarm display, and a control panel, including rotational and translational hand controllers at the orbiter aft flight deck flight crew station, and a manipulator controller interface unit that interfaces with the orbiter computer. One crew member operates the Canadarm from the aft flight deck control station, and a second crew member usually assists with television camera operations. This allows the Canadarm operator to view Canadarm operations through the aft flight deck payload and overhead windows and through the closed-circuit television monitors at the aft flight deck station.

The Canadarm is outfitted with an explosive-based mechanism to allow the arm to be jettisoned. This safety system would have allowed the Orbiter's payload bay doors to be closed in the event that the arm failed in an extended position and was not able to be retracted.

The Canadarm has six joints that correspond roughly to the joints of the human arm, with shoulder yaw and pitch joints, an elbow pitch joint, and wrist pitch, yaw, and roll joints. The end effector is the unit at the end of the wrist that grapples the payload's grapple fixture. The two lightweight boom segments are called the upper and lower arms. The upper boom connects the shoulder and elbow joints, and the lower boom connects the elbow and wrist joints.

Service history 

The Canadarm was first tested in orbit in 1981, on 's STS-2 mission. Its first operational use was on STS-3 to deploy and manoeuvre the Plasma Diagnostics Package. Canadarm subsequently flew on more than 90 missions with all five orbiters.

Since the installation of the Canadarm2 on the International Space Station (ISS), the two arms have been used to hand over segments of the station for assembly from the orbiter's Canadarm to the Canadarm2; the use of both elements in tandem has earned the nickname of "Canadian Handshake" in the media.

Retirement 
The Canadarm's 90th and final Shuttle mission was in July 2011 on STS-135, delivering the Raffaello MPLM to the ISS and back. It is on display with Atlantis at the Kennedy Space Center Visitor Complex. Discovery'''s Canadarm is displayed next to it in the National Air and Space Museum's Udvar-Hazy Center. Endeavour left its OBSS at the International Space Station as part of its final mission, while its Canadarm was originally going to be displayed in the headquarters of the Canadian Space Agency (CSA). However, Endeavours Canadarm is now on permanent display at the Canada Aviation and Space Museum in Ottawa. The last of the Canadarms to fly in space, the SRMS flown aboard Atlantis'' on STS-135 in July 2011, was shipped to NASA's Johnson Space Center in Houston for engineering study and possible reuse on a future mission.

Derivatives

Canadarm2 

Based on the Canadarm1, the larger Canadarm2 is used for berthing the trusses, berthing the commercial vehicles, and inspecting the whole International Space Station.

Canadarm3 

The smaller Canadarm3 will be used for berthing the modules and inspecting the Lunar Gateway.

In popular media 
 On November 13, 2012, Google Canada displayed a doodle on its home search page to celebrate the 31st anniversary of the Canadarm's first use in space.

See also 

 List of Canadian inventions and discoveries

References

External links 

 NASA:RMS: PAYLOAD DEPLOYMENT AND RETRIEVAL SYSTEM 
 Canadian Space Agency : Canadarm
 CBC Digital Archives - Canadarm - A Technology Star

Spacecraft components
Space program of Canada
Science and technology in Canada
Space Shuttle program
Space robots
Robotic manipulators
1981 robots